Bahari Ibaadat (born 21 March 1993) is an Afghan-American model based in Seattle, Washington who was crowned Miss Afghanistan 2014.

Biography 

Bahari Ibaadat was born in Kabul and raised in Pakistan, and then at the age ten she moved to the United States together with her family. She lives in Seattle Washington  as well in  Atlanta, Georgia, United States. On 2014 Bahari Win the title of miss Afghanistan Also was top 7 Miss Asia Pacific 2014 Supertalent of the World Season 5 in South Korea. Miss south west Bellevue and also competed in miss Washington pageant. In January 2014 Bahari Ibaadat won Miss Afghanistan, the pageant was held in Dubai due to the unstable situation in Afghanistan. The famous  model Bahari iBaadat is gaining a lot of fame in the world of modeling. She is widely known to have a similar face with Miss World 1994, Aishwarya Rai  people call her the   Afghanistan Ashiwara rai Bahari has the green blue eyes  just like the famous Miss world Ashwaray rai Bahari  appeared in many magazine covers and fashion shows like Safi Airways   She featured on the Safi Airways Inflight Magazine cover from November 2015   Bahari iBaadat was interviewed two full pages in Ariana Magazine issue 4  2021 Bahari iBaadat got featured in Hype magazine Hype (magazine) and many more. Today Bahari iBaadat  Is entertaining Miss world  or  Miss Universe pageant. Today Bahari Ibaadat remains the last Miss Afghanistan

Career 

Bahari Ibaadat is miss Afghanistan 2014 She  is a Former A&F model, cover of Safi Airways in flight magazine. She has done many runway shows such as Portland fashion, Seattle fashion week, Atlanta fashion week. She won the Tanland title with a famous Miss Supertalent, awarded the best performance as she can Belly dance and Break Dance

References

External links 
 
 Basic Information on Bahari iBaadat
 Official Miss Supertalent Official Website

Living people
1993 births
Afghan female models
People from Kabul
Afghan refugees
Afghan emigrants to Pakistan
Afghan emigrants to the United States
American models of Afghan descent